The Anglican Diocese of Harare is a diocese of the Church of the Province of Central Africa. The Anglican Diocese of Mashonaland was formed in 1891 and its first bishop was George Knight-Bruce. He was succeeded by William Gaul (1895–1907), formerly Rector of St Cyprian's Church in Kimberley, Northern Cape. Small in stature, Gaul styled himself “the smallest bishop with the largest Diocese in Christendom.” In 1915 the diocese became the Diocese of Southern Rhodesia  until 1952 when it reverted to the Diocese of Mashonaland. The diocese was known as the Diocese of Harare and Mashonaland, until changing his name to Diocese of Harare. It has experienced great turbulence in recent times.

The bishop's seat is at the Cathedral of St Mary and All Saints, Harare.

List of bishops
 George Knight-Bruce 1891–1895
 William Gaul 1895–1907
 Edmund Powell 1908–1910
 Frederic Beaven 1911–1925
 Edward Paget 1925–1957
 Cecil Alderson 1957–1968
 Paul Burrough 1968–c.1980
 Patrick Murindagomo was suffragan bishop in 1974
 Peter Hatendi c.1980–c.1995
 Jonathan Siyachitema c.1995–c.2001
 Nolbert Kunonga c.2001–2008
 Sebastian Bakare 2008–2009
 Chad Gandiya 2009–2018
 Farai Mutamiri 2019–

References

External links
 Official website

Anglicanism in Zimbabwe
Religious organizations established in 1891
1891 establishments in the British Empire
Harare